On an Ordnance Survey map of Suffolk, England, there are two settlements named Tunstall next to each other,  north east of Woodbridge. However, these are not two separate villages but one, despite the gap between the main village and the hamlet known as Tunstall Common. Both lie within the parish of Tunstall.

The village itself is a good sized settlement with a pub (The Green Man) and a church called St Michael's, notable for its unusual box pews. Half a mile away, Tunstall Common has a dozen houses and a Baptist chapel. Residents of the hamlet consider themselves to live at Tunstall on the Common, and letters are either addressed to The Common, Tunstall, or Tunstall Common.

Tunstall Common itself is a Site of Special Scientific Interest (SSSI), a beautiful fragment of the ancient sandling dry lowland heath that was once extensive across this area of coastal Suffolk. It lies next to Tunstall Forest, which was started in the 1920s as a pine plantation. In the Great Storm of 1987, Tunstall Forest lost thousands of trees and the opportunity was taken to diversify the mix of trees planted. The area has been designated an Area of Outstanding Natural Beauty and is a haven for wildlife, including fallow deer and muntjac. The adjacent Rendlesham Forest is known for the former RAF Bentwaters site, now in private ownership, and alleged alien sightings in the 1980s.

Literary references 
 The Black Arrow by Robert Louis Stevenson is set in Tunstall hamlet and forest.

References

External links

Tunstall & Sudbourne Baptist Church website

Villages in Suffolk
Civil parishes in Suffolk